Tabernaemontana pauli is a species of plant in the family Apocynaceae. It is endemic to Costa Rica.

References

Flora of Costa Rica
pauli
Vulnerable plants
Taxonomy articles created by Polbot